Sunny Days is the second studio album released by American girl band Allure. It was released by MCA Records on September 25, 2001 in the United States. Conceived after the folding of their debut label, singer Mariah Carey's record company Crave Records, it marked the quartet's debut with MCA as well as their first full-length release in four years. Sunny Days peaked at number 68 on the US Billboard Top R&B/Hip Hop Albums.

Critical reception

Allmusic editor Liana Jonas found that "within minutes of listening to the disc, audiences will think, 'this is like all the other girl-group R&B fare on the radio today'. And it is. Sunny Days is rife with contemporary danceable grooves, guest flows, urban flavor, and several grab-the-Kleenex ballads. And what's wrong with this? [...] To be sure, the band has matured. The songs sound more seasoned this go-round [...] Also, their voices sound more robust and confident [...] Welcome back, Allure. Here's hoping for more sunny days."

Track listing

Notes
 denotes additional producer

Charts

References

Allure (band) albums
2001 albums